Vachanam is a 1990 Malayalam movie directed by Lenin Rajendran. Starring: Jayaram, Suresh Gopi, Sithara, Charuhasan.The filim has musical score compossed by Mohan Sithara.This movie depict the mystery and workship. The movie is a perfect commercial movie with an added class. The thematic treatment is the main reason why it still stands out as a cult movie.

Cast
Jayaram as Gopan
Thilakan as Police Officer 
Sithara as Maya 
Suresh Gopi as Ravi
Charuhasan as Vishnuji
Sreevidya as Aryadevi 
Nedumudi Venu as Lawyer
Mamukkoya

Plot
The film starts with Ravi (Suresh Gopi) is attacked by a group of people on a rainy night. His friend Gopan (Jayaram) finds Ravi unconscious on the road and seeks help from the Police. By the time Gopan arrives with the police force, Ravi is missing. The story then flashes back to a few months back when Ravi followed by Gopan arrives at Shanthigiri monastery for research. Vishnuji, the spiritual head is running the monastery with the help of aid from foreigners. While Ravi idiolizes Vishnuji, Gopan only sees in him a fraud. Both the young men become friendly with Vishnuji's (Charuhasan) private secretary, Maya (Sithara). Very soon, Ravi and Maya find themselves attracted to each other, while Gopan helps them express themselves and start their relationship together. Aryadevi (Sreevidya), another spiritual leader visits Shanthigiri and it is revealed that she is Ravi's surrogate mother. Also it is revealed that Arya Devi was in an intimate relationship with Vishnuji and she accuses Vishnuji of pimping her to foreigners to collect money to start Shanthigiri monastery. Arya Devi requests Ravi to come back to their monastery, but Ravi rejects the idea. Back to present, a shrewd Police Officer (Thilakan) is assigned to investigate Ravi's's disappearance. After lot of revelations from many characters, he finds that Ravi had come to know about malpractices going on in the monastery including prostitution and had threatened Vishnuji to bring him down. Also Maya confesses to having overhearing Vishnuji's conversation with her father about the murder of Ravi. Vishnuji gets arrested, but his lawyer (Nedumudi Venu) establishes in court that Ravi is alive and is in hiding, while Gopan is a mental patient and can't be trusted. Finally the Court ends up acquitting Vishnuji of all charges and he goes out to a roaring welcome from his supporters. Disgusted with the failure of the judicial system, Gopan decides to take the matter into his own hands and doles out his own version of Justice.

Soundtrack
The film had musical score compossed by Mohan Sithara.The song Neermizhipeeliyil became very popular and made it to the hit charts.

 Neermizhipeeliyil : K.J. Yesudas

References

1990s Malayalam-language films
Films scored by Mohan Sithara